Aucán Huilcamán Paillama (born January 31, 1965) is the leader ("werkén") of the indigenous Mapuche organization Consejo de Todas las Tierras ("Council of all lands"). He intended to run for president in the 2005 election, but his candidacy was not accepted as he was not able to collect enough official votes validated by public notaries.

References

Chilean politicians
20th-century Mapuche people
21st-century Mapuche people
Chilean people of Mapuche descent
Indigenous leaders of the Americas
Candidates for President of Chile
Living people
1965 births